The #P-completeness of 01-permanent, sometimes known as Valiant's theorem, is a mathematical proof about the permanent of matrices, considered a seminal result in computational complexity theory. In a 1979 scholarly paper, Leslie Valiant proved that the computational problem of computing the permanent of a matrix is #P-hard, even if the matrix is restricted to have entries that are all 0 or 1. In this restricted case, computing the permanent is even #P-complete, because it corresponds to the #P problem of counting the number of permutation matrices one can get by changing ones into zeroes.

Valiant's 1979 paper also introduced   #P as a complexity class.

Valiant's definition of completeness, and his proof of completeness of 01-permanent, both used polynomial-time Turing reductions. In this kind of reduction, a single hard instance of some other problem in #P is reduced to computing the permanent of a sequence of multiple graphs, each of which could potentially depend on the results of previous permanent computations. A later simplification by  showed that it is possible to use a weaker notion of reduction, a polynomial-time counting reduction, that translates the other problem into a single instance of the permanent problem.

Significance
One reason for interest in the computational complexity of the permanent is that it provides an example of a problem where constructing a single solution can be done efficiently but where counting all solutions is hard.  As Papadimitriou writes in his book Computational Complexity:

Specifically, computing the permanent (shown to be difficult by Valiant's results) is closely connected with finding a perfect matching in a bipartite graph, which is solvable in polynomial time by the Hopcroft–Karp algorithm. For a bipartite graph with 2n vertices partitioned into two parts with n vertices each, the number of perfect matchings equals the permanent of its biadjacency matrix and the square of the number of perfect matchings is equal to the permanent of its adjacency matrix. Since any 0–1 matrix is the biadjacency matrix of some bipartite graph, Valiant's theorem implies that the problem of counting the number of perfect matchings in a bipartite graph is #P-complete, and in conjunction with Toda's theorem this implies that it is hard for the entire polynomial hierarchy.

The computational complexity of the permanent also has some significance in other aspects of complexity theory: it is not known whether NC equals P (informally, whether every polynomially-solvable problem can be solved by a polylogarithmic-time parallel algorithm) and Ketan Mulmuley has suggested an approach to resolving this question that relies on writing the permanent as the determinant of a matrix.

Hartmann  proved a generalization of Valiant's theorem concerning the complexity of computing immanants of matrices that generalize both the determinant and the permanent.

Ben-Dor and Halevi's proof
Below, the proof that computing the permanent of a 01-matrix is #P-complete is described.

Overview
Any square matrix  can be viewed as the adjacency matrix of a directed graph, with  representing the weight of the edge from vertex i to vertex j. Then, the permanent of A is equal to the sum of the weights of all cycle-covers of the graph; this is a graph-theoretic interpretation of the permanent.

#SAT, a function problem related to the Boolean satisfiability problem, is the problem of counting the number of satisfying assignments of a given Boolean formula. It is a #P-complete problem (by definition), as any NP machine can be encoded into a Boolean formula by a process similar to that in Cook's theorem, such that the number of satisfying assignments of the Boolean formula is equal to the number of accepting paths of the NP machine. Any formula in SAT can be rewritten as a formula in 3-CNF form preserving the number of satisfying assignments, and so #SAT and #3SAT are equivalent and #3SAT is #P-complete as well.

In order to prove that 01-Permanent is #P-hard, it is therefore sufficient to show that the number of satisfying assignments for a 3-CNF formula can be expressed succinctly as a function of the permanent of a matrix that contains only the values 0 and 1. This is usually accomplished in two steps:
This establishes that Permanent is #P-hard.
 Through a series of reductions, reduce Permanent to 01-Permanent, the problem of computing the permanent of a matrix all entries 0 or 1. This establishes that 01-permanent is #P-hard as well.

Constructing the integer graph

Given a 3CNF-formula  with m clauses and n variables, one can construct a weighted, directed graph  such that
 each satisfying assignment for  will have a corresponding set of cycle covers in  where the sum of the weights of cycle covers in this set will be  ; and
 all other cycle covers in  will have weights summing to 0.
(Valiant's original proof constructs a graph with entries in  whose permanent is  where  is "twice the number of occurrences of literals in " – .)

The graph construction makes use of a component that is treated as a "black box."  To keep the explanation simple, the properties of this component are given without actually defining the structure of the component.

To specify Gφ, one first constructs a variable node in Gφ for each of the n variables in φ. Additionally, for each of the m clauses in φ, one constructs a clause component Cj in Gφ that functions as a sort of "black box." All that needs to be noted about Cj is that it has three input edges and three output edges. The input edges come either from variable nodes or from previous clause components (e.g., Co for some o < j) and the output edges go either to variable nodes or to later clause components (e.g., Co for some ). The first input and output edges correspond with the first variable of the clause j, and so on. Thus far, all of the nodes that will appear in the graph Gφ have been specified.

Next, one would consider the edges. After the last clause in which  appears, we connect the appropriate output edge of the corresponding clause component back to 's variable node. Of course, this completes the cycle. To create the F-cycle, one would follow the same procedure, but connect 's variable node to those clause components in which ~ appears, and finally back to 's variable node. All of these edges outside the clause components are termed external edges, all of which have weight 1. Inside the clause components, the edges are termed internal edges. Every external edge is part of a T-cycle or an F-cycle (but not both—that would force inconsistency).

Notable properties of the graph

The sort of Z's that don't induce assignments are the ones with cycles that "jump" inside the clause components. Thus, these Z's assign either true or false (but never both) to each  and ensure that each clause is satisfied. Further, the sets of cycle covers corresponding to all such Z's have weight , and any other Z's have weight . The reasons for this depend on the construction of the clause components, and are outlined below.

The clause component

To understand the relevant properties of the clause components , one needs the notion of an M-completion. A cycle cover Z induces a satisfying assignment just in case its external edges satisfy certain properties.

We add here the premise that the construction of the clause components is such that the sum over possible M-completions of the weight of the internal edges in each clause component, where M is proper relative to the clause component, is 12. Otherwise the weight of the internal edges is 0.

The clause component is a weighted, directed graph with 7 nodes with edges weighted and nodes arranged to yield the properties specified above, and is given in Appendix A of Ben-Dor and Halevi (1993). Note that the internal edges here have weights drawn from the set ; not all edges have 0–1 weights.

Finally, since the sum of weights of all the sets of cycle covers inducing any particular satisfying assignment is 12m, and the sum of weights of all other sets of cycle covers is 0, one has Perm(Gφ) = 12m·(#φ). The following section reduces computing Perm() to the permanent of a 01 matrix.

01-Matrix

The above section has shown that Permanent is #P-hard. Through a series of reductions, any permanent can be reduced to the permanent of a matrix with entries only 0 or 1. This will prove that 01-Permanent is #P-hard as well.

Reduction to a non-negative matrix

 Compute . The choice of Q is due to the fact that 
 Compute 
 Compute 
 If  then Perm(A) = P. Otherwise 

An example of the transformation and why it works is given below.

Thus

Note how the elements are non-negative because of the modular arithmetic. It is simple to compute the permanent

so . Then , so

Reduction to powers of 2

Note that any number can be decomposed into a sum of powers of 2. For example,

This fact is used to convert a non-negative matrix into an equivalent matrix whose entries are all powers of 2. The reduction can be expressed in terms of graphs equivalent to the matrices.

Every edge  with weight  is converted into an equivalent edge with weights in powers of 2 as follows:
, 

This can be seen graphically in the Figure 1. The subgraph that replaces the existing edge contains  nodes and  edges.

From the construction, one can see that there are  different paths and sum of all these paths equal to the weight of the edge in the original graph .

Reduction to 0–1

The objective here is to reduce a matrix whose entries are powers of 2 into an equivalent matrix containing only zeros and ones (i.e. a directed graph where each edge has a weight of 1).

Let G be a -node directed graph where all the weights on edges are powers of two. Construct a graph, where the weight of each edge is 1 and Perm(G) = Perm(G').

This reduction is done locally at each edge in G that has a weight larger than 1. Let  be an edge in G with a weight .  It is replaced by a subgraph  that is made up of  nodes and  edges as seen in Figure 2. Each edge in  has a weight of 1.  Thus, the resulting graph G' contains only edges with a weight of 1.

As each edge has a weight of one, the weight of the resulting cycle cover is equal to that of the original cycle cover.
At each step down the subgraph there are two choices one can make to form such a path. Thus, there are  possible cycle covers and since each path has a weight of 1, the sum of the weights of all these cycle covers equals the weight of the original cycle cover.

Aaronson's proof
In 2011, quantum computer scientist Scott Aaronson proved that the permanent is #P-hard using quantum methods.

References

Computational problems
Combinatorics
Article proofs